Collar counties is a colloquialism for DuPage, Kane, Lake, McHenry, and Will counties, the five counties of Illinois that border Cook County, which is home to Chicago. The collar counties are part of the Chicago metropolitan area and comprise many of the area's suburbs. While Lake County, Indiana also borders Cook County, it is not typically included in the phrase "Collar Counties" due to different socioeconomic characteristics and positionality. 

After Cook County, the collar counties are also the next five most populous counties in Illinois. According to the Encyclopedia of Chicago, there is no specifically known origin of the phrase, but it has been commonly used among policy makers, urban planners, and in the media.

In 1950, the Census Bureau defined the Chicago metropolitan statistical area as comprising Cook County, four of the five collar counties (excluding McHenry), and Lake County in Indiana. In 2010, reflecting urban growth, the Bureau redefined the area as comprising several additional counties in Illinois, Indiana, and Wisconsin.

As of 2019, there are 3,150,376 people residing in the collar counties, nearly 25% of the population of Illinois. Cook County and the collar counties combined are home to approximately 65% of Illinois's population.

Use in political discussions 
While it is not its exclusive use, the term is often employed in political discussions. Like many other suburban areas in the United States, the collar counties have somewhat different political leanings from the core city. Chicago has long been a Democratic stronghold, while the collar counties historically tilted Republican. In recent elections, however, the collar counties have voted for Democrats, but with lower margins than Cook County.

Because Cook County tends to vote for Democrats by large margins, and downstate Illinois tends to vote for Republicans by large margins, the collar counties are routinely cited as being the key to any statewide election. However, that conventional wisdom was challenged in the 2010 gubernatorial election, as Democrat Pat Quinn won election while winning only Cook County and three counties in Southern Illinois. All five collar counties went Republican, so the key to that gubernatorial election was winning Cook County by a wide enough margin to overwhelm the rest of the state.

Barack Obama used the term in his speech before the Democratic National Convention in 2004.

See also
 Lake County, Indiana
 Hamilton County, Indiana
 Chicago metropolitan area
 The St. Louis, Missouri Metro-East region of Illinois (Madison County, St. Clair County, Montgomery County, Macoupin County, Jersey County, Bond County, and Adams County)
 Orange County, California
 Long Island
 Northern Virginia
 Cobb County, Georgia
 Gwinnett County, Georgia
 WOW counties
 Philadelphia metropolitan area

References

 
Illinois counties
Electoral geography of the United States
Politics of Illinois